The Avro Type H, Type 501, and Type 503 were a family of early British military seaplanes. They were a development of the Avro 500 design and were originally conceived of as amphibious, the prototype being fitted with a single large main float (equipped with wheels) under the fuselage, and two outrigger floats under the wings.

Design and development
Tests were conducted on Windermere in January 1913. It was later converted to a twin-float configuration and bought by the British Admiralty. It now, however, proved too heavy and was converted again – this time to a landplane.

An improved version, designated the 503, was demonstrated to the Inspector of Naval Aircraft, who placed an order for three machines. The prototype itself was demonstrated for the Imperial German Navy in its seaplane trials in June 1913 and was purchased by the government of the German Empire for evaluation purposes. This machine subsequently became the first aircraft to fly across the North Sea, from Wilhelmshaven to Heligoland, in September 1913. Gotha purchased a licence from Avro and produced the type as the WD.1 (Wasser Doppeldecker – "Water Biplane").

Operators 

 Kaiserliche Marine – one aircraft.

 Royal Naval Air Service

 Ottoman Air Force

Specifications (501 seaplane)

See also

References

Further reading

External links 

Avro 501 – British Aircraft Directory

1910s British military utility aircraft
Floatplanes
501
501, Avro
Biplanes
Single-engined tractor aircraft
Amphibious aircraft
Aircraft first flown in 1913
Rotary-engined aircraft